Kaliachak College is a college situated at Sultanganj, Kaliachak I CD block in the Malda district of West Bengal, India. The college is affiliated to the University of Gour Banga, offering undergraduate courses.

Departments

Science
Botany
Zoology

Arts
Bengali 
English
Arabic
Sanskrit
History
Geography
Political Science
Sociology
Education
Economics
Philosophy

See also

References

External links
www.kaliachakcollege.edu.in
University of Gour Banga
University Grants Commission
National Assessment and Accreditation Council

Universities and colleges in Malda district
Colleges affiliated to University of Gour Banga
Academic institutions formerly affiliated with the University of North Bengal
Educational institutions established in 1995
1995 establishments in West Bengal